Nyaruguru is a district (akarere) in Southern Province, Rwanda. Its capital is Kibeho, a pilgrimage site of the Catholic Church.

Geography 
The district is the most southerly in Rwanda, lying between the cities of Butare and Cyangugu and along the Burundian border. It is mountainous, containing part of the montane forest of Nyungwe, one of Rwanda's most popular tourist destinations, which also provides cooking charcoal for much of the Southern region. This one of the last remaining forest areas of Rwanda and home to chimpanzees and many other species of primate.

Sectors 
Nyaruguru district is divided into 14 sectors (imirenge): Cyahinda, Busanze, Kibeho, Mata, Munini, Kivu, Ngera, Ngoma, Nyabimata, Nyagisozi, Muganza, Ruheru, Ruramba and Rusenge.

References 
 
 Inzego.doc — Province, District and Sector information from MINALOC, the Rwanda ministry of local government.

Southern Province, Rwanda
Districts of Rwanda